The following is a list of transfers for the 2011 S.League.

Albirex Niigata (S)

In
  Shuhei Hotta from Consadole Sapporo
  Shotaro Ihata from Roasso Kumamoto
  Yōsuke Saito from Yokohama F. Marinos
  Musashi Okuyama from Albirex Niigata
  Norihiro Kawakami from Zweigen Kanazawa
  Shimpei Sakurada from Japan Soccer College
  Kunihiro Yamashita from Roasso Kumamoto
Out
  Ken Matsumoto to Sisaket FC
  Mitsuki Ichihara to United Sikkim FC

Balestier Khalsa FC

In
  Armanizam Dolah from Gombak United
  Anaz Hadee from Woodlands Wellington
  Lim Young Woo
  Kim Young Kwang from Suwon City FC
Out
  Daniel Hammond to SAFFC
  Rivaldo Costa Amaral Filho *released
  Goh Swee Swee to Woodlands Wellington
  Han Yiguang to Woodlands Wellington
  Mohamed Sofiyan Bin Abdul Hamid to Geylang United

Etoile FC

In
  Jonathan Justin from Auch Gascogne
Out
  Frédéric Mendy to Home United FC
  Karim Boudjema to Othellos Athienou F.C.
  Flavien Michelini to FC Gueugnon
  Kevin Yann to PSMS Medan
  Khaled Kharroubi to Osotspa Saraburi FC

Geylang United FC

In
  Mohamed Sofiyan Bin Abdul Hamid from Balestier Khalsa
  Joo Ki Hwan

Out
  Itimi Dickson *released
  Siddiq Durimi to Home United
  Toh Guo An *released
  Rastislav Beličák *released
  Peter Tomko *released
  Walid Lounis to Gombak United

Gombak United FC

In
  Walid Lounis from Geylang United
  Tengku Mushadad from Home United

Out
  Armanizam Dolah to Balestier Khalsa
  Fazrul Nawaz to SAFFC
  Bah Mamadou to SAFFC
  Fabian Tan *released

Home United FC

In
  Frédéric Mendy from Etoile FC
  Kenji Arai from Hougang United FC
  Qiu Li from Tampines Rovers
  Siddiq Durimi from Geylang United
  Kim Dae Eui from Suwon Samsung Bluewings

Out
  Choi Chul-Woo *retired
  Jun Woo Keun *retired
  Chun Jae Woon *released
  Tengku Mushadad to Gombak United
  Ridhuan Fatah Hassan to Hougang United FC

Hougang United FC

In
  Diego Gama
  Carlos Alberto
  Ridhuan Fatah Hassan from Home United
  Noor Ali from Woodlands Wellington
  Fumiya Kobayashi from Albirex Niigata (S)
Out
  Kenji Arai to Home United
  Mojtaba Tehranizadeh *released
  Amos Boon to Woodlands Wellington

Singapore Armed Forces FC

In
  Fazrul Nawaz from Gombak United
  Daniel Hammond from Balestier Khalsa
  Luka Savic from Young Lions
  Bah Mamadou from Gombak United
  Mislav Karoglan from HNK Rijeka *on loan

Out
  John Wilkinson to Insee Police
  Ivan Lovrić *released
  Federico Martinez *released
  Ahmad Latiff to Tampines Rovers
  Park Tae Won *released

Tampines Rovers FC

In
  Ahmad Latiff from SAFFC

Out
  Zulkarnaen Zainal *retired
  Qiu Li to Home United

Woodlands Wellington FC

In
  Goh Swee Swee from Balestier Khalsa
  Han Yiguang from Balestier Khalsa
  Amos Boon from Hougang United FC
  Munier Raychouni
  Adrian Butters from Toronto Lynx
  Graham Tatters from FC Tampa Bay
  Leonardo Alexio da Costa from FC Volyn Lutsk
Out
  Anaz Hadee to Balestier Khalsa
  Noor Ali to Hougang United FC
  Kazuki Yoshino to Sisaket F.C.
  Abdelhadi Laakkad *released
  Luis Eduardo Hicks *released
  Rachid Lajane *released

Young Lions

In

Out
  Luka Savic to SAFFC
  Kim Seong Kyu *released
  Seo Su Jong *released

References

Singapore